Lazir may refer to:

 Ləzir, Azerbaijan
 Lazir, Mandaran, Iran
 Lazir, Tehran, Iran
 Lazir, daikundi, afghanistan